Jamestown is an unincorporated community and census-designated place (CDP) in Clallam County, Washington, United States. The population was 361 at the 2010 census.

The community derives its name from Chief James, a Clallam Indian leader.

Geography
Jamestown is located in northeastern Clallam County, along the shore of the Strait of Juan de Fuca southeast of Dungeness.

See also
Jamestown S'Klallam Tribe of Washington

References

Census-designated places in Clallam County, Washington
Census-designated places in Washington (state)